Marc Pelchat (born September 16, 1967) is an American speed skater. He is from Chelmsford, Massachusetts and attended Chelmsford High School and Northern Michigan University. He competed in men's 500 metres at the 1998 Winter Olympics in Nagano and the 2002 Winter Olympics in Salt Lake City, where he placed 23rd and 28th respectively.

References

External links
 

1967 births
Living people
American male speed skaters
Olympic speed skaters of the United States
Speed skaters at the 1998 Winter Olympics
Speed skaters at the 2002 Winter Olympics
People from Chelmsford, Massachusetts
Chelmsford High School alumni
Sportspeople from Middlesex County, Massachusetts